Paul Graham Popham (October 6, 1941 – May 7, 1987) was an American gay rights activist who was a founder of the Gay Men's Health Crisis and served as its president from 1981 until 1985. He also helped found and was chairman of the AIDS Action Council, a lobbying organization in Washington. He was the basis for the character of Bruce Niles in Larry Kramer's The Normal Heart, which was one of the first plays to address the HIV/AIDS crisis.

Life and career
Popham was born in Emmett, Idaho, and graduated from Portland State College, Oregon.

He was a Vietnam War veteran who was awarded the Bronze Star Medal for valor in 1966, serving as a first lieutenant in the Fifth Air Cavalry. He retired in 1969 as a Special Forces major in the United States Army Reserve.

After his time in the army, Popham worked as a banker on Wall Street for the Irving Trust Company, leaving as a vice president in 1980. Thereafter, he joined McGraw-Hill Inc. as a general manager.

Popham did not become politically active until reading a newspaper article in 1981 about the disease that became known as AIDS. Richard D. Dunne, president of the Gay Men's Health Crisis at the time of Popham's death said: "His history had been quite the opposite from a gay activist. It was only an issue like AIDS that galvanized people like Paul." Popham was diagnosed with AIDS in February 1985 and remained active with GMHC until his illness became too severe.

He was survived by his mother, brother, two sisters and his longtime partner Richard DuLong.

The Normal Heart 
Larry Kramer, who later left GMHC to found ACT UP, frequently fought with Popham. Kramer wrote in Reports from the Holocaust that, as a result, when writing the roman à clef play The Normal Heart, Kramer made the protagonist Ned Weeks (the cypher for himself) be obnoxious and Bruce Niles (the cypher for Popham) be a clearly sympathetic leader, by way of contrition.

Bruce Niles was portrayed by David Allen Brooks (The Public Theatre, 1985), Andrzej Szczytko (Polish Theatre in Poznań, 1987; Polish Television Theatre, 1989), Lee Pace (Golden Theatre, 2011) and Taylor Kitsch (HBO television film, 2014).

References

1941 births
1987 deaths
AIDS-related deaths in New York (state)
Gay men
HIV/AIDS activists
LGBT people from Idaho
LGBT people from New York (state)
American LGBT rights activists
People from Emmett, Idaho
Portland State University alumni
20th-century LGBT people